Brantleyville is a census-designated place and Unincorporated community in Shelby County, Alabama, United States. Its population was 884 as of the 2010 census.

Demographics

References

Census-designated places in Shelby County, Alabama
Census-designated places in Alabama
Unincorporated communities in Alabama
Unincorporated communities in Shelby County, Alabama